Overlord is an anime series based on the light novel series of the same name written by Kugane Maruyama and illustrated by so-bin. The third season aired from July 11 to October 2, 2018.

The opening theme is "VORACITY" by MYTH & ROID, and the ending theme song is "Silent Solitude" by OxT.


Episode list

Home media release

Japanese

English

Notes

References

Overlord episode lists
2018 Japanese television seasons